In Your Hands is a 2007 Italian drama film directed by Peter Del Monte. It entered the Panorama section at the 2007 Turin International Film Festival.

Cast 

Kasia Smutniak: Mavi
Marco Foschi: Teo
Luisa De Santis: Madre di Teo
Severino Saltarelli: Padre di Teo
Luciano Bartoli: Padre di Mavi 
Alba Rohrwacher: Carla

References

External links

2007 films
Italian drama films
Films directed by Peter Del Monte
2007 drama films
2000s Italian-language films
2000s Italian films